The Blohm & Voss BV 246 Hagelkorn (German language: "Hailstone") was a guided glide bomb developed to bomb specific targets (bridges, ships, etc.) once it was released.

History

This glider was designed by Richard Vogt, at first under the designation of BV 226, which was later changed to its definitive designation BV 246 on December 12, 1943.

The construction of the BV 246 avoided the usual aircraft techniques and strategic materials, so it could be mass-produced. It had clean aerodynamics, with high aspect ratio wings that made possible a glide ratio of 25:1. The wings were made of magnesite cement, formed around a steel spar. It had a cruciform tail in an early version and a double vertical tail mounted on the sides of a wide horizontal stabilizer in a later version.

Initial tests revealed that the basic design was workable, but that the weapon was very inaccurate and because of this it was rejected. However, work was restarted in 1943, with 11 different versions being planned, due to its simple and inexpensive construction, and the new development contract was awarded to the Karlshagen test centre. A series of tests was begun to improve the weapon's accuracy, with air drops performed by KG 101. Despite unpromising results, the Ministry of Aviation nevertheless issued the order to commence mass production on 12 December 1943. In February 1944 the contract was cancelled due to the success of the V-1 flying bomb.

The weapon was revived a further time, in early 1945, as an early form of anti-radiation weapon, using the Radieschen passive seeker which was designed to home in on Allied radar transmitters; around 1,000 units were produced but never used operationally.

See also
 Azon
 ASM-N-2 Bat WW II autonomous radar-guidance glide bomb (U.S. Navy)
 Blohm & Voss BV 143
 Blohm & Voss BV 950
 GB-4
 GB-8
 Fritz X
 Felix
 Blohm & Voss BV 40 glider interceptor

References

Notes

Bibliography

 Smith, J. Richard and Kay, Anthony. German Aircraft of the Second World War. London: Putnam & Company Ltd., 3rd impression 1978, p. 664-666. .

External links

Remote Piloted Aerial Vehicles
Blohm & Voss BV 246 Glide Bomb

BV 246
Guided bombs
Weapons and ammunition introduced in 1945
Twin-tail aircraft